The 2009 Eastern Illinois Panthers football team represented  Eastern Illinois University as a member of the Ohio Valley Conference (OVC) during the 2009 NCAA Division I FCS football season. The team was led by 22nd-year head coach Bob Spoo and played their home games at O'Brien Field in Charleston, Illinois. The Panthers finished the season with an 8–4 record overall and a 6–2 record in conference play, making them conference champions. The team received an automatic bid to the NCAA Division I Football Championship playoffs, where they lost to Southern Illinois in the first round. Eastern Illinois was ranked No. 19 in The Sports Network's postseason ranking of NCAA Division I FCS teams.

The team retired former quarterback Tony Romo's jersey number before their October 17 game against .

Schedule

References

Eastern Illinois
Eastern Illinois Panthers football seasons
Ohio Valley Conference football champion seasons
Eastern Illinois Panthers football